Meeting Gorbachev is a 2018 biographical documentary film directed by Werner Herzog and André Singer about the life of Mikhail Gorbachev, the eighth and last leader of the Soviet Union. The film features three interviews between Herzog and Gorbachev, conducted over the span of six months, and had its world premiere at the Telluride Film Festival on September 1, 2018.

The film ends with  Gorbachev reciting the poem "I Go Out On The Road Alone" by Mikhail Lermontov.

Release
The film premiered at the Telluride Film Festival on September 1, 2018. It was then screened at the Toronto International Film Festival on September 10, 2018, where it received wider press coverage.

Critical reception
The site's critical consensus reads, "Meeting Gorbachev plays to filmmaker Werner Herzog's endlessly inquisitive strengths -- and reveals the fascinating story of a pivotal political figure." David Ehrlich of IndieWire "ultimately because of Gorbachev's seeming unwillingness to fit the director's usual mold that Meeting Gorbachev is able to become such a different and engaging bio-doc." While overall positive, Jessica Kiang of Variety criticized the film, saying that the film, "though consistently engaging, is less a fireworks display than a fireside chat, and so feels curiously like an opportunity missed."

References

External links

American documentary films
British documentary films
German documentary films
Cultural depictions of Mikhail Gorbachev
Films directed by Werner Herzog
1091 Media films
2010s American films
2010s British films
2010s German films